Bardeh Mish (also Romanized as Bardeh Mīsh; also known as Bardel Mīsh) is a village in Akhtachi-ye Gharbi Rural District, in the Central District of Mahabad County, West Azerbaijan Province, Iran. At the 2006 census, its population was 221, in 39 families.

References 

Populated places in Mahabad County